Oktawia Maria Nowacka (born  2 January 1991) is a Polish modern pentathlete. She is the 2016 Olympic bronze medalist. Nowacka won the gold medal in the team event at the 2015 World Modern Pentathlon Championships. She has been a vegan since 2013.

References

External links 
 

1991 births
Living people
Polish female modern pentathletes
Modern pentathletes at the 2016 Summer Olympics
Olympic modern pentathletes of Poland
People from Starogard Gdański
Medalists at the 2016 Summer Olympics
Olympic bronze medalists for Poland
Olympic medalists in modern pentathlon